Viluyo (possibly from Aymara wila blood, blood-red, uyu corral,  "red corral") is a mountain in the Vilcanota mountain range in the Andes of Peru, about  high. It is located in the  Cusco Region, Canchis Province, Pitumarca District, east of  Sibinacocha. It lies south and southwest of Condoriquiña.

References

Mountains of Cusco Region
Mountains of Peru